Vítor Costa (born 28 May 1974) is a Portuguese hammer thrower. His personal best is 76.86 metres, achieved in July 2004 in Reims.

He finished ninth at the 1992 World Junior Championships. On senior level he competed at the World Championships in 1997 and 1999 as well as the Olympic Games in 2000 and 2004 without reaching the final.

Achievements

References

1974 births
Living people
Portuguese male hammer throwers
Athletes (track and field) at the 2000 Summer Olympics
Athletes (track and field) at the 2004 Summer Olympics
Olympic athletes of Portugal